The Premier of KwaZulu-Natal is the head of government of the KwaZulu-Natal province of South Africa. The current Premier of KwaZulu-Natal is Nomusa Dube-Ncube, a member of the African National Congress. She is the first elected woman to assume this position and took office on 10 August 2022.

Functions
In terms of the Constitution of South Africa, the executive authority of each province is entrusted in the province's Premier. The Premier appoints an Executive Council consisting of ten members of the provincial legislature; they are called Members of the Executive Council (MECs). The MECs are effectively ministers in the provincial government, and the Executive Council is effectively the Premier's cabinet. MECs serve at the Premier's discretion. The Premier and the Executive Council are responsible for implementing provincial legislation and any national legislation allocated to the province. They set provincial policy and manage the departments of the provincial government; their actions are subject to the national constitution.

In order for an act of the provincial legislature to become law, the Premier must sign it. If he believes that the act is unconstitutional, it can be referred back to the legislature for reconsideration. If the Premier and the legislature cannot agree, the act must be referred to the Constitutional Court for final consideration. The Premier is also ex officio a member of the National Council of Provinces, the upper house of Parliament, as one of the special delegates from his province.

Election
Elections to the KwaZulu-Natal Provincial Legislature must be held every five years, usually at the same time as the election of the National Assembly; the last such election occurred on 8 May 2019. At the first meeting of the provincial legislature after an election, the members indirectly elect the Premier from amongst themselves. 

The provincial legislature can force the Premier to resign by a motion of no confidence. If the Premiership becomes vacant (for whatever reason) the provincial legislature must choose a new Premier to serve out the period until the next election. One person cannot have served more than two five-year terms as Premier; however, when a Premier is chosen to fill a vacancy the time until the next election does not count as a term.

List

See also

 Premier (South Africa)
 President of South Africa
 Politics of South Africa

References

External links
 Official website

Premiers of KwaZulu-Natal
Government of KwaZulu-Natal